The Cathedral of Our Lady, or Tournai Cathedral, is a Roman Catholic cathedral, see of the Diocese of Tournai in Tournai, Belgium. It has been classified both as a Wallonia's major heritage since 1936 and as a World Heritage Site since 2000.

History

Early history
There was a diocese centered at Tournai from the late 6th century and this structure of local blue-gray stone occupies rising ground near the south bank of the Scheldt, which divides the city of Tournai into two roughly equal parts. Begun in the 12th century on even older foundations, the building combines the work of three design periods with striking effect, the heavy and severe character of the Romanesque nave contrasting remarkably with the transitional work of the transept and the fully developed Gothic of the choir. The transept is the most distinctive part of the building, with its cluster of five bell towers and apsidal (semicircular) ends.

The nave belongs mostly to the first third of the 12th century. Prefiguring the Early Gothic style, it has a second-tier gallery between the ground-floor arcade and the triforium. Pilasters between the round-arched windows in the clerestory help support the 18th-century vaulting that replaced the original ceiling, which was of wood, and flat.

The transept arms, built in about the mid-12th century, have apsidal ends, a feature borrowed in all probability from certain Rhenish churches, and which would appear to have made its influence felt in the north-east of France, as at Noyon and Soissons. They vary in detail, some of the arcade work with which they are enriched being in the round-arched and some in the pointed style.

Bishop Gautier de Marvis had the earlier Romanesque choir demolished in the 13th century, in order to replace it with a Gothic choir of much grander dimensions, inspired by the likes of Amiens Cathedral. The construction of the new choir began in 1242, and ended in 1255. The rest of the cathedral was supposed to be rebuilt in the same style as the choir, but this was never attempted, the only later additions being the western porch, and a large Gothic chapel which was built alongside one of the side aisles, whose original walls and windows disappeared in the process.

The rood screen is a Renaissance masterpiece by Flemish sculptor Cornelis Floris and dates from 1573.

Damage and restoration
The cathedral was damaged by a severe tornado on the 24 August 1999. Assessment of the damage revealed underlying structural problems and the cathedral has been undergoing extensive repairs and archaeological investigation ever since. The Brunin Tower was stabilised in 2003.

In recognition of Tournai cathedral's cultural value, UNESCO designated the building a World Heritage Site in 2000.

Specifications

Bells
Tournai Cathedral has five bells: Marc, Marie-Nicolas, Marie-Étienne, Marie-Gasparine (also known as Marie-Pontoise by Tournaisians) and Catherine. Marie-Gasparine and Marie-Étienne are considered bourdon bells due to their deep notes. Marie-Gasparine is the largest of the five bells, it was cast in 1843 and weighs 9 tons.

Burials
 Eleutherius of Tournai
 Nicolas Gombert
 Adolf, Duke of Guelders

Gallery

See also 
 Roman Catholic Marian churches
 List of tallest structures built before the 20th century

References
Citations

Bibliography

External links

 
 
 
 Tournai: Our Lady's Cathedral - from Belgium Travel Network
 Tournai Cathedral (pdf) - UNESCO site, contains detailed description and history
 Cathedral Notre-Dame - from official site of the city of Tournai

Roman Catholic churches completed in 1700
Wallonia's Major Heritage
Roman Catholic cathedrals in Belgium
World Heritage Sites in Belgium
Romanesque architecture in Belgium
Gothic architecture in Belgium
Churches in Hainaut (province)
Tournai